"Seven Tears" is a popular song by the Goombay Dance Band, released in 1981. It was released as the only single from their third studio album, Holiday in Paradise, and was subsequently featured on the UK-only compilation Seven Tears.

Written by Wolff-Ekkehardt Stein and Wolfgang Jass, and produced by Jochen Peterson, "Seven Tears" was a major hit across Europe in the winter and spring of 1982. The song spent three weeks at number one on the UK Singles Chart, being the fourth time a German act had topped the UK chart, six weeks after Kraftwerk had achieved that feat with "The Model" in 1982 and Boney M with "Rivers Of Babylon" and "Mary's Boy Child" in 1978.

Track listings
7" vinyl single

12" vinyl single

Charts

Weekly charts

Year-end charts

Cover versions
French singer Séverine recorded a German version in 1981 named "Sieben Tränen".
Dutch singer Arne Jansen recorded a Dutch version, named "Zeven brieven", which was a charting hit in 1982.
The song was covered by Croatian pop singer Darko Domijan as "Sedam suza" in 1982.
The Swedish dansband Jigs recorded a Swedish version of the song in 1982, named "Hundra tårar".
Croatian singer Maja Blagdan also covered the song as "Sedam suza" in 1997.

References

1981 singles
1982 singles
Goombay Dance Band songs
Irish Singles Chart number-one singles
UK Singles Chart number-one singles
1981 songs
CBS Records singles
Epic Records singles